Tomotla is an unincorporated community along the Valley River in Cherokee County, in the U.S. state of North Carolina.

History
A post office called Tomotla was established in 1848, and remained in operation until 1948. The name "Tomotla" is derived from the Yamasee Indians. The name variant "Tomotley" was also used for more than one historic Cherokee town.

References

Unincorporated communities in North Carolina
Unincorporated communities in Cherokee County, North Carolina